Containerlift is a freight transport company in the United Kingdom. Containerlift introduced the sidelifter transport concept widely used in Australia and New Zealand to the UK.

The company has since expanded into general container movement, using sidelifters, conventional road transport, rail transport and logistics and consultancy. It has expanded abroad to sites in France, The Netherlands and Ireland. 

In September 2005 Containerlift introduced a pioneering new service transporting containers between the deep water port of Thamesport and destinations in London, using an intermediate scheduled rail service to Willesden with partner English Welsh & Scottish. This service is unusual in the fact that modern rail based container transport has been traditionally done over much longer distances, marking a shift in the economies involved, when considering traffic congestion, fuel prices and driver shortages.

Operating centres

 Birmingham
 Bristol
 Dublin
 Glasgow
 Isle of Grain
 Immingham
 Leeds
 Lille
 Liverpool
 Manchester
 Rotterdam
 Southampton
 South Shields
 Tilbury

See also
 Containerization
 Intermodal container
 Intermodal freight transport

References

External links
Containerlift Official site

Logistics companies of the United Kingdom